Maria Luisa Ambrosini is a non-fiction author.

Her work appears in Harpers.
She is secretary at Bocconi University.

Works
  (reprint Barnes & Noble Publishing, 1996)

References

Italian non-fiction writers
Living people
Year of birth missing (living people)
Italian women writers